

In physical cosmology, the inflationary epoch was the period in the evolution of the early universe when, according to inflation theory, the universe underwent an extremely rapid exponential expansion. This rapid expansion increased the linear dimensions of the early universe by a factor of at least 1026 (and possibly a much larger factor), and so increased its volume by a factor of at least 1078. Expansion by a factor of 1026 is equivalent to expanding an object 1 nanometer (10−9 m, about half the width of a molecule of DNA) in length to one approximately 10.6 light years (about 62 trillion miles) long.

Description

Vacuum state is a configuration of quantum fields representing a local minimum (but not necessarily a global minimum) of energy.

Inflationary models propose that at approximately 10−36 seconds after the Big Bang, vacuum state of the Universe was different from the one seen at the present time: the inflationary vacuum had a much higher energy density.

According to general relativity, any vacuum state with non-zero energy density generates a repulsive force that leads to an expansion of space. In inflationary models, early high-energy vacuum state causes a very rapid expansion. This expansion explains various properties of the current universe that are difficult to account for without such an inflationary epoch.

Most inflationary models propose a scalar field called the inflaton field, with properties necessary for having (at least) two vacuum states.

It is not known exactly when the inflationary epoch ended, but it is thought to have been between 10−33 and 10−32 seconds after the Big Bang. The rapid expansion of space meant that any potential elementary particles (or other unwanted artifacts, such as topological defects) remaining from time before inflation were now distributed very thinly across the universe.

When the inflaton field reconfigured itself into the low-energy vacuum state we currently observe, the huge difference of potential energy was released in the form of a dense, hot mixture of quarks, anti-quarks and gluons as it entered the electroweak epoch.

Detection via polarization of cosmic microwave background radiation 
One approach to confirming the inflationary epoch is to directly measure its effect on the cosmic microwave background (CMB) radiation. The CMB is very weakly polarized (to a level of a few μK) in two different modes called E-mode and B-mode (by analogy to the E-field and B-field in electrostatics). The E-mode polarization comes from ordinary Thomson scattering, but the B-mode may be created by two mechanisms:
 from gravitational lensing of E-modes; or
 from gravitational waves arising from cosmic inflation.
If B-mode polarization from gravitational waves can be measured, it would provide direct evidence supporting cosmic inflation and could eliminate or support various inflation models based on the level detected.
     
On 17 March 2014, astrophysicists of the BICEP2 collaboration announced the detection of B-mode polarization attributed to inflationary-related gravitational waves, which seemed to support cosmological inflation and the Big Bang, however, on 19 June 2014 they lowered the confidence level that the B-mode measurements were actually from gravitational waves and not from background noise from dust.

The Planck spacecraft has instruments that measure the CMB radiation to a high degree of sensitivity (57 nK). After the BICEP finding, scientists from both projects worked together to further analyze the data from both projects. That analysis concluded to a high degree of certainty that the original BICEP signal can be entirely attributed to dust in the Milky Way and therefore does not provide evidence one way or the other to support the theory of the inflationary epoch.

See also

Notes

References

External links
 Inflation for Beginners by John Gribbin
 NASA Universe 101 What is the Inflation Theory?

Physical cosmology
Big Bang
Inflation (cosmology)